is a railway station of the Chūō Main Line, East Japan Railway Company (JR East) in Hatsukari-Shimohatsukari, in the city of Ōtsuki, Yamanashi Prefecture, Japan. The station also has a freight terminal operated by the Japan Freight Railway Company.

Lines
Hatsukari Station is served by the Chūō Main Line, and is 93.9 kilometers from the terminus of the line at Tokyo Station.

Station layout
The station consists of one ground level island platform, connected to the station building by a level crossing. The station is unattended.

Platforms

Station history
Hatsukari Station was opened on July 9, 1908 as a signal stop on the Japanese Government Railways (JGR) Chūō Main Line. It was elevated to a full station for passenger and freight services on February 10, 1910. The JGR became the JNR (Japanese National Railways) after the end of World War II. The current station building was completed in October 1951. With the dissolution and privatization of the JNR on April 1, 1987, the station came under the control of the East Japan Railway Company. Automated turnstiles using the Suica IC Card system came into operation from October 16, 2004.

Passenger statistics
In fiscal 2012, the station was used by an average of 393 passengers daily (boarding passengers only).

Surrounding area
former Hatsukari village hall

See also
 List of railway stations in Japan

References

 Miyoshi Kozo. Chuo-sen Machi to eki Hyaku-niju nen. JT Publishing (2009)

External links

JR East Hatsukari Station

Railway stations in Yamanashi Prefecture
Railway stations in Japan opened in 1910
Chūō Main Line
Stations of East Japan Railway Company
Stations of Japan Freight Railway Company
Ōtsuki, Yamanashi